UFC 243: Whittaker vs. Adesanya was a mixed martial arts pay-per-view event produced by the Ultimate Fighting Championship that took place on October 6, 2019, at Marvel Stadium in Melbourne, Victoria, Australia.

Background
The event was the fourth that the promotion had contested in Melbourne and second at the venue, following UFC 193 in November 2015.

A UFC Middleweight Championship unification bout between the champion Robert Whittaker (also The Ultimate Fighter: The Smashes welterweight winner) and undefeated interim champion Israel Adesanya served as the event's headliner.

A women's bantamweight bout between former UFC Women's Bantamweight Champion Holly Holm and former title challenger Raquel Pennington was expected to take place at this event. The pairing previously met at UFC 184 in February 2015, when Holm won via split decision in her UFC debut. However, on September 27, it was revealed that Holm withdrew from the bout due to a hamstring injury and the bout was cancelled.

At the weigh-ins, Khalid Taha and Ji Yeon Kim missed the required weight for their respective fights. Taha weighed in at 137 pounds, 1 pound over the bantamweight non-title fight limit of 136. Meanwhile, Kim weighed in at 128 pounds, 2 pounds over the flyweight non-title fight limit of 126. Both bouts were held at catchweight. Taha and Kim were fined 20% and 30% of their purse respectively, which went to their opponents Bruno Gustavo da Silva and Nadia Kassem.

Results

Bonus awards
The following fighters received $50,000 bonuses.
Fight of the Night: Brad Riddell vs. Jamie Mullarkey
Performance of the Night: Israel Adesanya and Yorgan de Castro

Records set
UFC 243 broke the attendance record for a UFC event with a total of 57,127 people. The previous record (56,214) had been set at the same venue in November 2015 at UFC 193.

See also

 List of UFC events
 2019 in UFC
 List of current UFC fighters

References 

Ultimate Fighting Championship events
2019 in mixed martial arts
Mixed martial arts in Australia
Sports competitions in Melbourne